Tang Kai (Chinese: 唐凯, January 10, 1996) is a Chinese professional mixed martial artist currently competes in the Featherweight division for ONE Championship. He is the current ONE Featherweight World Champion.

Mixed martial arts career

Early career
Tang started his professional MMA career in 2016 and fought primarily in China. Amassed a record of 8–2 prior to his joined with ONE Championship.

ONE Championship
Tang his promotional debut against Sung Jong Lee at ONE: Hero's Ascent on January 25, 2019. He won the fight via head kick knockout in the second round.

Tang faced Edward Kelly at ONE: Age Of Dragons on November 16, 2019. He won the fight via unanimous decision.

Tang faced Keanu Subba at ONE: Reign of Dynasties 2 on October 9, 2020, and aired on October 16, 2020. He won the fight via unanimous decision.

Tang faced Ryogo Takahashi at ONE: Fists Of Fury 2 on February 26, 2021, and aired on March 5, 2021. He won the fight via TKO in the first round.

Tang faced Yoon Chang Min at ONE: NextGen 2 on October 29, 2021, and aired on November 12, 2021. He won the fight via TKO in the first round.

Tang was scheduled to face Kim Jae Woong on January 28, 2022, at ONE: Only the Brave. However, Kim forced to withdraw before the event due to undisclosed medical issue. The pair was rescheduled to meet at ONE: X on March 26, 2022. He won the fight via knockout in the first round. This win earned him the Performance of the Night award.

ONE Featherweight World Champion
Tang faced Thanh Le for the ONE Featherweight World Championship at ONE 160 on August 26, 2022. He won the bout via unanimous decision and capture the ONE Featherweight Championship.

Championships and accomplishments
ONE Championship
ONE Featherweight World Championship (One time; current)
Performance of the Night (One time) 
WBK
WBK Featherweight Tournament Winner

Mixed martial arts record

|-
| Win
| align=center| 15–2
| Thanh Le 
| Decision (unanimous)
| ONE 160
| 
| align=center| 5
| align=center| 5:00
| Kallang, Singapore 
| 
|-
| Win
| align=center| 14–2
| Kim Jae Woong 
| KO (punches)
| ONE: X 
| 
| align=center| 1
| align=center| 2:07
| Kallang, Singapore 
| 
|-
| Win
| align=center| 13–2
| Yoon Chang Min
| TKO (punches)
| ONE: NextGen 2
| 
| align=center| 1
| align=center| 4:03
| Kallang, Singapore
|
|-
| Win
| align=center| 12–2
| Ryogo Takahashi 
| TKO (punches)
| ONE: Fists Of Fury 2 
| 
| align=center| 1
| align=center| 1:59
| Kallang, Singapore 
|
|-
| Win
| align=center| 11–2
| Keanu Subba
| Decision (unanimous)
| ONE: Reign of Dynasties 2
| 
| align=center| 3
| align=center| 5:00
| Kallang, Singapore
|
|-
| Win
| align=center| 10–2
| Edward Kelly
| Decision (unanimous)
| ONE: Age Of Dragons
| 
| align=center| 3
| align=center| 5:00
| Beijing, China
|
|-
| Win
| align=center| 9–2
| Sung Jong Lee
| KO (head kick)
| ONE: Hero's Ascent
| 
| align=center| 2
| align=center| 1:14
| Pasay, Philippines
| 
|-
| Win
| align=center| 8–2
| Nikolay Kondratuk
| TKO (punches)
| Rebel FC 8
| 
| align=center| 1
| align=center| 1:41
| Guangzhou, China
|
|-
| Win
| align=center| 7–2
| Mario Sismundo
| TKO (punches)
| Rebel FC 7
| 
| align=center| 2
| align=center| 1:05
| Shanghai, China
|
|-
| Win
| align=center| 6–2
| Mark Gregory Valerio
| KO
| Rebel FC 6
| 
| align=center| 2
| align=center| 3:48
| Shenzhen, China
|
|-
| Loss
| align=center| 5–2
| Asikeerbai Jinensibieke
| Decision (unanimous)
| Kunlun Fight MMA 10 
| 
| align=center| 3
| align=center| 5:00
| Beijing, China
|
|-
| Loss
| align=center| 5–1
| Bekhruz Zukhurov
| Decision (unanimous)
| WBK 21 
| 
| align=center| 3
| align=center| 5:00
| Ningbo, China
|
|-
| Win
| align=center| 5–0
| Asror Olimshoev
| TKO (retirement)
| rowspan=2|WBK 19 
| rowspan=2|
| align=center| 2
| align=center| 5:00
| rowspan=2| Ningbo, China
| 
|-
| Win
| align=center| 4–0
| Avliyohon Hamidov
| TKO (punches)
| align=center| 2
| align=center| 4:39
| 
|-
| Win
| align=center| 3–0
| Hadi Purnomo
| TKO (punches)
| WBK 16
| 
| align=center| 2
| align=center| 0:29
| Ningbo, China
|
|-
| Win
| align=center| 2–0
| Artur Kascheev
| TKO (punches)
| WBK 15
| 
| align=center| 1
| align=center| N/A
| Ningbo, China
|
|-
| Win
| align=center| 1–0
| Jose Francisco Vinuelas
| TKO (punches)
| WBK 14
| 
| align=center| 1
| align=center| N/A
| Jiangyan, China
| 
|-

See also
List of current ONE fighters

Notes

References

External links
 Tang Kai at ONE

1996 births
Chinese male mixed martial artists
Living people
People from Shaoyang
Sportspeople from Hunan
Lightweight mixed martial artists
Featherweight mixed martial artists
Mixed martial artists utilizing wrestling
Mixed martial artists utilizing boxing
Chinese male sport wrestlers
ONE Championship champions